The Carlos Palanca Memorial Awards for Literature winners in the year 1954 (rank, title of winning entry, name of author).


English division

Short story
First prize: "Death in a Sawmill" by Rony V. Diaz
Second prize: "The Beads" by S.V. Epistola
Third prize: "The Morning Before Us" by Gilda Cordero Fernando

One-act play
First prize: "The World is an Apple" by Alberto S. Florentino Jr.
Second prize: "Cowards Die a Thousand Deaths" by Fidel Sicam
Third prize: "Prelude to Glory" by Paulina Bautista

Filipino (Tagalog) division

Short story in Filipino
First prize: "Sa Kamatayan Lamang" by Teodoro Agoncillo
Second prize: "Ang Pusa sa Aking Durungawan" by Buenaventura S. Medina Jr.
Third prize: "Matalino ang Inaanak Ko" by Fernando L. Samonte

One-act play in Filipino
First prize: "Hulyo 4, 1954 A.D." by Dionisio S. Salazar
Second prize: "Ang Politiko" by Lazaro R. Banag Jr.
Third prize: "Ang Aking Kapatid" by Deogracias Tigno Jr.

More winners by year

References
 

Palanca Awards